Why Don't We, shortened to WDW, are an American boy band consisting of Jonah Marais, Corbyn Besson, Daniel Seavey, Jack Avery, and Zach Herron. They were formed in 2016 and have released two studio albums and six extended plays.

History

2016–2017: Career beginnings 
The band originally formed on September 27, 2016, after having all met in Los Angeles, California a year prior. On October 20, 2016, the group released their debut single "Taking You", a track from their debut EP, Only the Beginning, which was released on November 25 of the same year. They embarked on their first headlining tour, the "Taking You Tour", the next year. Their second EP, Something Different, was released on April 21, 2017. Following the release of their second EP, they embarked on the Something Different Tour, their second headlining tour. The group's third EP, Why Don't We Just, was released on June 2, 2017. In September 2017, the band signed with Atlantic Records. That same month, Invitation, their fourth EP, was released. On November 23, 2017, they released their fifth EP, A Why Don't We Christmas. In 2018, in support of the Invitation EP, they headlined the "Invitation Tour". Additionally the band has appeared in several vlogs of YouTuber Logan Paul.

2018–2019: 8 Letters and 12/12 era
On August 31, 2018, they released their first album, 8 Letters. The record debuted at number nine on the US Billboard 200, and was preceded by three singles: "Hooked", "Talk", and "8 Letters". In March 2019, they embarked on the "8 Letters Tour".

Why Don't We released a new song each month in 2019. On January 16, they released "Big Plans", and a music video was released three days later. The song received a gold certification from the RIAA in April 2020. On Valentine's Day, the group released "Cold In LA", along with a music video two days later. On March 20, 2019, they released the humorous song "I Don't Belong in This Club" featuring American rapper Macklemore. It was certified gold by the RIAA in August 2020. On April 20, the group released "Don't Change", which was featured on the soundtrack album of the animated film UglyDolls. In May, the group unveiled their fifth song of the year, "Unbelievable". In June, they released "Come To Brazil", inspired by fans frequently asking them to visit the country. On July 26, the band released the song "I Still Do". On August 23, they released "What Am I", penned by Ed Sheeran, who previously wrote "Trust Fund Baby". The song was certified gold by the RIAA in June of the following year. On October 25, they released "Mad At You". The following month, the group released the Christmas song "With You This Christmas". On December 30, the group released their twelfth and final song of 2019, "Chills". The group then took a nine-month break shortly after the music video release.

2020–2022: The Good Times and the Bad Ones and hiatus 
On September 29, 2020, the band released "Fallin' (Adrenaline)", the lead single from their second album, The Good Times and the Bad Ones. It debuted at number 37 on the US Billboard Hot 100 chart, their first ever entry. Their second single from the album, "Lotus Inn", was released on December 4, 2020. They starred in a YouTube documentary titled 30 Days With, which showed the last stages of development and behind the scenes content of their then-upcoming album for 30 days. Their third single from the album, "Slow Down", was released on December 17, 2020. On January 15, 2021, The Good Times and The Bad Ones was released. The album is largely self-produced, although it also features the productions of Travis Barker, Skrillex, and Timbaland. The album debuted at number 3 on the Billboard 200 albums chart, making this their highest entry on the chart.

The band released the single "Love Back" on October 6, 2021. The band then release a cover of Justin Bieber's "Mistletoe" in December that same year. In January 2022, they released their next single in collaboration with Jonas Blue: "Don't Wake Me Up", followed by "Let Me Down Easy (Lie)" in April, “Just Friends” on May 13, and “How Do You Love Somebody” on May 31.

The band's North American tour, The Good Times Only Tour, was scheduled to commence in June 2022, but was canceled due to the litigation between Why Don't We current manager Randy Phillips and former manager David Loeffler. The band rescheduled the tour with new dates beginning in July. However, on July 6, exactly three weeks before the tour's first show, the band announced that due to ongoing legal battles with their former management, they would be cancelling the tour and going on a hiatus.

Musical influences

The band has cited Justin Bieber as their main musical inspiration, in addition to 5 Seconds of Summer, Boyz II Men, The Beatles, Drake, Ed Sheeran, Childish Gambino, Jon Bellion, Post Malone, Frank Ocean and CNCO.

Band members

Jack Robert Avery
Jack Robert Avery (born July 1, 1999) was born in Burbank, California, but raised in Susquehanna, Pennsylvania. Avery released a solo single called "Liar" in 2016 and was part of the meet-and-greet tour "Impact", which members Zach Herron and Corbyn Besson were also a part of. He also starred in a short film called Fearless Five. On April 22, 2019, Avery's former girlfriend, Gabriela Gonzalez, gave birth to their daughter.

Corbyn Matthew Besson 
Corbyn Matthew Besson (born November 25, 1998) was born in Dallas, Texas, but raised in Virginia. Besson went to high school in Centreville, Virginia. Besson's cousins are Dutch girl group O'G3NE. Before Why Don't We, he had a following on YouNow and released a solo single called "The Only One" to iTunes in 2014. His other acoustic single, "Marathon", was also released on the platform.

Zachary Dean Herron
Zachary Dean Herron (born May 27, 2001), the youngest member of the group, was raised in Dallas, Texas. Growing up, he sang in the choir. Before Why Don't We, Herron covered songs on YouTube and also produced two singles himself, "Timelapse" and "Why".

Jonah Marais Roth Frantzich

Jonah Marais Roth Frantzich (born June 16, 1998), the eldest member of the group, grew up in Stillwater, Minnesota. Before Why Don't We, Marais had a following on YouNow and released an album, When the Daylight's Gone, in 2016 and went on the 2014 DigiTour.

Daniel James Seavey
Daniel James Seavey (born April 2, 1999), born in Vancouver, Washington. He grew up in Portland, Oregon. A main producer of the band, he can play over 20 instruments by ear. As a child, his father would take him to do street performances on the city's art walks. Seavey competed on season 14 of American Idol and finished in ninth place. He also has released multiple songs on his own including his newest singles "Bleed on Me", "Can We Pretend That We're Good?", "Runaway" and "I Tried".

Tours
Headlining
Taking You Tour (2017)
Something Different Tour (2017)
Invitation Tour (2018)
8 Letters Tour (2019)

Discography

 8 Letters (2018)
 The Good Times and the Bad Ones (2021)

Awards and nominations

iHeartRadio MMVAs

!
|-
| 2018
| Themselves
| Fan Fave New Artist
| 
|
|}

iHeartRadio Music Awards

!
|-
| 2018
| Themselves
| Best Boy Band
|rowspan="4" 
|
|-
|rowspan="2"|2019
| Limelights
| Best Fan Army
|rowspan="2" |
|-
| Zack Caspary
| Favorite Tour Photographer
|-
|rowspan="2"|2020
| Limelights 
| Best Fan Army
|rowspan="2" |
|-
| Zack Caspary
| Favorite Tour Photographer
| 
|}

MTV Europe Music Awards

!
|-
| 2018
| Themselves
| Best Push
| 
|
|}

MTV Video Music Awards

!
|-
| 2018
| Themselves
| Push Artist of the Year
| 
|
|-
|2019
|Themselves
| Best Group
| 
|
|}

Nickelodeon Kids' Choice Awards

!
|-
| 2018
|rowspan="2"|Themselves
| Favorite Musical YouTube Creator
|rowspan="2" 
|
|-
| 2019
| Favorite Social Music Star
|
|}

Radio Disney Music Awards

!
|-
|rowspan="2"|2018
| Themselves
| Best New Artist
|rowspan="2" 
|rowspan="2"|
|-
| "These Girls"
| Best Song to Lip Sync to
|}

Teen Choice Awards

!
|-
|rowspan="2"|2018
| Themselves
| Choice Music Group
|rowspan="2" 
|rowspan="2"|
|-
| "Trust Fund Baby"
| Choice Song: Group
|-
|rowspan="3"|2019
| Themselves
| Choice Music Group
| 
|rowspan="3"|
|-
| Themselves
| Choice Summer Group
|rowspan="2" 
|-
| "8 Letters"
| Choice Song: Group
|}

Explanatory notes

References

"In the Limelight" Autobiography of the boys

External links

2016 establishments in California
American boy bands
Atlantic Records artists
Musical groups established in 2016
Musical groups from Los Angeles
Vocal quintets